Ivanyuk is a gender-neutral Ukrainian surname. Notable people with the surname include:

Dmitry Ivanyuk (1900–1941), Soviet Army colonel 
Ilya Ivanyuk (born 1993), Russian high jumper

See also
Ivanik

Ukrainian-language surnames